Horozlu (Hangediği) is a village in the Mersin Province, Turkey. It's part of Toroslar district (which is an intracity district within Mersin city). The population of the village  was 191  as of 2012.

References

External links
For images

Villages in Toroslar District